Physoconops gracilis is a species of thick-headed fly in the family Conopidae.

References

Conopidae
Articles created by Qbugbot
Insects described in 1885